McGee Field/Harris Stadium (officially Benjamin Humphreys McGee Field at Eugene O. Harris Stadium) located in Sewanee, Tennessee is the home of the Sewanee Tigers football and lacrosse teams. It was dedicated as McGee Field at homecoming on October 22, 1977. Before then the stadium was known as Hardee Field, named for Lt. General William J. Hardee of the Confederate States of America. Thus sometimes the field is also called Hardee-McGee Field. McGee Field is the oldest stadium in the South still in use.

Benjamin Humphreys McGee
McGee was a Greenville, Mississippi native and 1949 graduate of Sewanee, known as "Ug."

Eugene O. Harris
The stadium was dedicated to Harris in November 1957.

History
McGee Field dates back to the first instance of the Sewanee–Vanderbilt football rivalry on November 7, 1891, and is the oldest in the south and the fourth oldest in the nation. That day in '91 saw Sewanee's first ever football game and Vanderbilt's second. The Commodores won 22 to 0. Just eleven years before, Stoll Field at the University of Kentucky saw the South's first football game. For twenty years (1894-1913) Sewanee did not lose a game played "on the mountain." Perhaps the first big event happened in 1897 when Sewanee held John Heisman's Auburn Tigers to a scoreless tie on McGee Field.

References

College football venues
Sewanee Tigers football
American football venues in Tennessee
Buildings and structures in Franklin County, Tennessee
1891 establishments in Tennessee
Sports venues completed in 1891